The USCC Racing Association (USCC) is a group and sponsor for cross country snowmobile racing in the United States. Its races primarily take place in the midwest: Minnesota, Wisconsin, North Dakota and Michigan. The USCC was founded in 2002 by former ISOC professional snowmobile racer Pat Mach. The USCC currently hosts the famed International 500 (or commonly referred to as the "I-500") which is by far the most publicized cross-country snowmobile race in the circuit and the lower 48 states of the United States.

USCC has corporate sponsors for all the events, here is a list of a few of the bigger sponsors: Arctic Cat, Polaris, Yamaha, ArcticFX, Brothers Motorsports, Seven Clans Casino, FOX Racing Shox, FXR, Studboy among others.

References

External links
Official website (archived)

Motorsport in the United States
Snowmobile racing